Lavington is an unincorporated community located in the North Okanagan regional district and Okanagan region of British Columbia, Canada. It is home to Lavington Elementary School, which is part of School District 22 Vernon.

References 

Unincorporated settlements in British Columbia
Populated places in the Regional District of North Okanagan
Populated places in the Okanagan Country